Wick railway station is a railway station located in Wick, in the Highland council area in the far north of Scotland. It serves the town of Wick and other surrounding areas in the historic county of Caithness, including Staxigoe, Papigoe and Haster. It is managed by ScotRail, who operate all trains serving the station.

History

The station was designed by Murdoch Paterson and built by the Sutherland and Caithness Railway, opening the line in 1874. A wrought-iron turntable,  in diameter, was installed at the station by the Railway Steel and Plant Company of Manchester, along with an engine shed capable of housing four engines and a special loading bank for the loading of herring for the southern markets.

On 1 July 1903, the Wick and Lybster Light Railway was opened, and Wick became a junction station. The last trains to Lybster ran in 1944, although the line was not officially closed until 1951.

This practice ended when s were introduced on the line  since then all services run in full between Inverness and Wick via Thurso, in both directions, adding up to 30 minutes to journey times to and from Wick.

Queen Elizabeth II and Prince Philip visited the station in 2002, as part of a tour for Elizabeth's Golden Jubilee.

Accidents and incidents 
On 30 June 1909, Peter Doull, a coal trimmer, was killed by a train in the coal siding.

On 3 May 1941, a goods train pulling into the station collided with an empty carriage at the platform. The buffers failed to stop the carriage, which carried forward and piled up onto the platform, where one end crashed into the Menzies bookstall. The platform buffers were found buried beneath the wreckage of the bookstall.

Location

Facilities

The station has a single platform, which is long enough to accommodate a ten-carriage train. The station is fully wheelchair-accessible, but it is not monitored by CCTV.

The station has a ticket office, staffed between 10:10 and 17:15 every day except Sundays. There are no self-service ticket machines or smartcard top-up facilities, although there are smartcard validators. Other facilities include: a free car park with 12 parking spaces, a sheltered bike stand with 10 spaces, a payphone that accepts both cash and card, waiting rooms with designated seating areas, toilets (only open during staffing hours) and a post box.

There is no bus stop located directly outside the station.

Passenger volume 

The statistics cover twelve month periods that start in April.

Services
On Sundays this drops to just one train per day each way.

Cultural References 
On 19 August 2017, Geoff Marshall and Vicki Pipe, presenters of the documentary series All the Stations, completed their 14-week journey at Wick, having started at Penzance on 7 May 2017. That marked the end of their successful project to visit all 2,563 railway stations in Great Britain.

References

Bibliography 

 
 
 
 ScotRail North Highlands Timetable

External links

Annotated video of Wick railway station

Railway stations in Caithness
Railway stations served by ScotRail
Railway stations in Great Britain opened in 1874
Former Highland Railway stations
Wick, Caithness
Category B listed buildings in Highland (council area)
Listed railway stations in Scotland